West Melton is a town in the Selwyn District, in the Canterbury region of New Zealand's South Island. The town has a population of 2,640 (June 2022), making it the 124th-largest urban area in New Zealand, the 16th-largest in Canterbury and fifth-largest in the Selwyn District (behind Darfield and before Leeston).

History 

West Melton was first settled in the 1870s, where it has long been associated with horse racing (trotting), cropping, and sheep farming. Recently, it has become associated with wine growing and deer farming. In 1881, Alfred Saunders arrived in West Melton, where he bought a farm that he referred to as a “bleak and wild looking property”.

On 26 October 2014, West Melton residents celebrated the town's 150th anniversary.

Urban expansion 
In 2007, West Melton saw the start of its urban expansion. Gainsborough and Halkett Grove subdivisions were the first developments to be built, followed by Preston Downs to the west of Gainsborough and a third subdivision called Wilfield built to the south of Gainsborough. 

One more subdivision and a southern extension of Wilfield are planned to be built. This third subdivision is being developed by Hughes Developments Ltd, and will be built to the east of Gainsborough. A retirement village, developed by Marama Te Wai Ltd, is to be built to the west of Preston Downs. This is in contrast to scaled-down plans. In December 2020, original plans were for a 50-hectare subdivision to be built, however, in June 2022, only 12.5 hectares was allocated for zoning change.

The spread of housing developments into fertile rural land has led to tensions between the traditional farming community and recent arrivals. It is common for these tensions to spill onto community notice boards.

Demographics 

West Melton had a population of 2,085 at the 2018 New Zealand census, an increase of 1,305 people (167.3%) since the 2013 census, and an increase of 1,758 people (537.6%) since the 2006 census. There were 675 households. There were 1,017 males and 1,068 females, giving a sex ratio of 0.95 males per female. The median age was 39.7 years (compared with 37.4 years nationally), with 549 people (26.3%) aged under 15 years, 207 (9.9%) aged 15 to 29, 1,116 (53.5%) aged 30 to 64, and 210 (10.1%) aged 65 or older.

Ethnicities were 94.0% European/Pākehā, 5.9% Māori, 0.9% Pacific peoples, 5.2% Asian, 0.6% MELAA and 1.7% other ethnicities (totals add to more than 100% since people could identify with multiple ethnicities).

The proportion of people born overseas was 19.0%, compared with 27.1% nationally.

Although some people objected to giving their religion, 51.9% had no religion, 40.1% were Christian, 0.1% were Hindu, 0.3% were Muslim, 1.0% were Buddhist and 1.3% had other religions.

Of those at least 15 years old, 444 (28.9%) people had a bachelor or higher degree, and 153 (10.0%) people had no formal qualifications. The median income was $55,400, compared with $31,800 nationally. The employment status of those at least 15 was that 918 (59.8%) people were employed full-time, 246 (16.0%) were part-time, and 27 (1.8%) were unemployed.

West Melton and the Selwyn District are two of the fastest growing areas in New Zealand with regards to population, and economic progression.

Halkett is a rural statistical area north of West Melton and south of the Waimakariri River. It covers 86.01 km2 (33.21 sq mi).

Newtons Road is a rural statistical area south of West Melton, and north of Burnham Military Camp and Rolleston. It covers 153.14 km2 (59.13 sq mi).

Services 

West Melton has a shopping precinct including a Four Square supermarket, community centre and a domain, as well as a primary school. West Melton Aerodrome is located in the area, as is the Canterbury Astronomical Society.

West Melton also has a Rugby Football club with a long and proud history. The club is known for its exciting style of Rugby at the Rippa Rugby level, with many of those players going on to play U8. Although success at senior level has been elusive, the following players have gone on to higher representative level...

The West Melton Car Key club is another popular club enjoyed by the residents of this small Canterbury town. Established in 2015 in the Gainsborough subdivision, this club was set up to promote stronger relationships between neighbours and to provide alternative entertainment to the local pubs on cold winter nights.

The West Melton community centre was demolished in 2020 and replaced with an improved Gymnasium with multiple features such as; Badminton courts and a yoga room.

A skate park was added next to the community centre in 2022

Education
West Melton School is a full primary school catering for years 1 to 8.

Transport

Bus 
West Melton is serviced with the 86 bus route, a morning and evening express route that connects Darfield with the Central Christchurch.

Road 
West Melton is also closely linked to the newly built extension of the Christchurch Southern Motorway via Weedons Ross Road Interchange. 

In 2023, West Melton's first set of traffic lights are to be installed at the intersection of State Highway 73 and Weedons Ross Road.

References

External links
 Selwyn District Council
 West Melton & Halkett

Selwyn District
Populated places in Canterbury, New Zealand